Mina Q'asa (Spanish mina mine, Quechua q'asa mountain pass, "mine pass", also spelled Minajasa) is a mountain in the Wansu mountain range in the Andes of Peru, about  high. It is situated in the Apurímac Region, Antabamba Province, Oropesa District. Mina Q'asa lies south of Puka Urqu and southeast  of Millu.

References 

Mountains of Peru
Mountains of Apurímac Region